Government Higher Secondary School, Palayamkunnu (short names: GHSS Palayamkunnu) (HSE Code: 01013) is a Higher Secondary School under The Government of Kerala following SCERT syllabus in Palayamkunnu, near Ayiroor, Varkala (Thiruvananthapuram district of Kerala State, India).

Courses

Higher secondary of GHSS Palayamkunnu provides classes for Bio-Maths Batch (PCMB), Maths-Computer(PCMC) and Commerce Batch. HSE classes are following English Medium. Secondary education is offered in both Malayalam and English media.

Programmes

The teaching methodology follows IT@School Project which has remodeled conventional teaching methodologies in classrooms through the use of IT. The school follows the initiative, thus every teacher is allowed laptops and interactive software.

Campus

The campus consists of many blocks, like the HSS block, Secondary block, UP Block(Government Upper Primary School), Mini-Auditorium(Ramanujan Hall), Laboratory Block etc.

Facilities
The college has transportation facilities(school bus), laboratory, smart class, drisyavedhi (Malayalam:ദൃശ്യവേദി, stage) etc.

References

Schools in Thiruvananthapuram district
High schools and secondary schools in Kerala